Thorsten Margis (born 14 August 1989) is a German bobsledder.

Career
Margis competed at the 2014 Winter Olympics for Germany. He teamed with driver Francesco Friedrich, Gregor Bermbach and Jannis Bäcker in the Germany-2 sled in the four-man event, finishing 10th.

As of April 2014, his best showing at the World Championships is 4th, in the 2013 team event, with his best finish in an Olympic discipline 13th in the 2013 four-man event.

Margis made his World Cup debut in January 2013. As of April 2014, he has three World Cup podium finishes, with his best result being a pair of silver medals in 2013–14.

Margis and Francesco Friedrich tied with Canada's Justin Kripps and Alexander Kopacz for the gold medal at the 2018 Winter Olympics in Pyeongchang, South Korea.

World Cup Podiums

References

External links

Thorsten Margis at the German Bobsleigh, Luge, and Skeleton Federation 

1989 births
Living people
Olympic bobsledders of Germany
People from Bad Honnef
Sportspeople from Cologne (region)
Bobsledders at the 2014 Winter Olympics
Bobsledders at the 2018 Winter Olympics
Bobsledders at the 2022 Winter Olympics
German male bobsledders
Olympic medalists in bobsleigh
Olympic gold medalists for Germany
Medalists at the 2018 Winter Olympics
Medalists at the 2022 Winter Olympics